Kinchant Dam is a rural locality in the Mackay Region, Queensland, Australia. In the  Kinchant Dam had a population of 123 people.

Geography
The water storage facility named Lake Kinchant created by the Kinchant Dam is wholly within the locality. The dam is built on Sandy Creek to provide irrigation and town water. However most of the water in the lake does not come from Sandy Creek but is pumped from the Pioneer River at Mirani Weir into an  channel into the lake.

Much of the mountain is within the Mount Kinchart Conservation Park.

History
Francis Charlton Kinchant (1790–1815) was killed in the Battle of Waterloo. His middle name (Charlton) was his grandmothers maiden surname. While it may not have been a well-used given name, his heroic death may have inspired another Kinchant (not necessarily a relative) to name his son “Francis Charlton”. In 1856 a man named Francis Charlton Kinchant arrived in Australia. On 18 March 1867 he married Jane Martin in Mackay, supposedly the first wedding in that town. His connection to the Mackay district is unknown but it is likely that Mount Kinchant was named for him. He died in Mackay in 1913.

The dam was built in 1977.

In the  Kinchant Dam had a population of 123 people.

Education
Kinchant Dam Outdoor Education Centre is an Outdoor and Environmental Education Centre at 685 Kinchant Dam Road. It offers camping programs to develop teamwork, leadership, and resilience.

There are no regular schools in the locality. The nearest primary schools are North Eton State School in neighbouring North Eton to the east, Eton State School in neighbouring Eton to the south-east and Mirani State School in neighbouring Mirani to the north. The nearest secondary school is Mirani State High School in Mirani.

Attractions 
Kinchant Dam offers opportunities for fishing and boating. There is a boat ramp into Kinchant Dam on Kinchant Dam Road, which is managed by the SunWater. There is also a downhill mountain bike circuit.

There is a lookout and picnic and barbeque facilities. Camping is available.

See also

 List of Queensland Conservation Parks

References 

Mackay Region
Localities in Queensland